Elsey Station is a pastoral lease that once operated as a cattle station in the Northern Territory of Australia.

The Roper River and many of its tributary creeks run through the property. The land is about 10% flood plain, 15% black soil country, 60% red sandy country and 15% ridge country.
 
The property is owned by the Mangarrayi Aboriginal Land Trust. In 2001 Elsey had a herd of about 7,000 cattle grazing on its pastures.

The station is named after Elsey Creek that runs through the property. Elsey creek was named after Joseph Ravenscroft Elsey, the surgeon who travelled with the Augustus Charles Gregory expedition from Victoria River to Queensland via the Roper River.

The lease was taken up by Abraham Wallace in 1879, and he embarked on a trek from his other station, Sturts Meadow in outback New South Wales, in January 1880. The property was later named Elsey Station and Wallace left the next day to return to Sturts Meadows.

Aeneas and Jeannie Gunn arrived at Elsey in 1902, Gunn owned a quarter share in the property but died there in 1903 from blackwater fever. Jeannie returned to Melbourne and in 1908 wrote the book We of the Never Never based on her time at Elsey.

In 1946 the filming crew for The Overlanders arrived at the Roper River camp the Station for a month, where the river crossing sequence was shot.

The auctioneer tried to open the bidding at £200,000 but could only attract a bid of £140,000 from an agent acting on behalf of a Victorian syndicate, who assured that all historic landmarks on the property would be preserved.

During the 1960s, Brahman cattle were introduced to the property, which coincided with the appearance of Parkinsonia weeds at Elsey. The weevil Penthobruchus germaini, a chrysomelid of the subfamily Bruchinae, was introduced as a biological control for Parkinsonia in 1995, but it is still being poisoned to prevent it spreading.
In February 2000, the Howard government representative John Herron handed over the title deeds of the property in a formal ceremony at Elsey to the traditional owners of the area, the Mangarrayi people. The Elsey claim had taken nearly nine years to resolve.

See also
List of ranches and stations
List of the largest stations in Australia

References

Stations (Australian agriculture)
Pastoral leases in the Northern Territory
1879 establishments in Australia